The National List (Reshima Mamlakhtit), sometimes translated as the State List, was a political party in Israel. Despite being founded by David Ben-Gurion, one of the fathers of the Israeli left, the party is one of the ancestors of the modern-day Likud, Israel's largest right-wing bloc.

Background
The National List had been formed by Ben-Gurion prior to the 1969 elections after his former party, Rafi, had merged into the Alignment against his wishes.

The new party won four seats in the seventh Knesset, and Ben Gurion was joined in the Knesset by Meir Avizohar, Isser Harel and Yigal Hurvitz. During the session Avizohar defected to the Alignment, leaving the party with three seats. Ben-Gurion resigned from the Knesset in 1970, and was replaced by Zalman Shoval.

Without Ben Gurion's leadership, the party began to disintegrate. Before the 1973 elections it joined the Likud alliance formed by Herut, the Liberal Party (which had formerly been allied as Gahal), Free Centre and the Movement for Greater Israel. The new alliance won 39 seats, with Hurvitz and Shoval being elected to the Knesset on its list. In 1976 the National List merged with the Movement for Greater Israel and the Independent Centre (a breakaway from the Free Centre) to form the La'am faction within Likud, and ceased to exist as an independent entity.

Reformation
The party was briefly reformed during the ninth Knesset after Hurvitz, Shoval and Yitzhak Peretz had left Likud to create Rafi – National List on 26 January 1981. On 19 May Shoval and Hurvitz left to establish Telem with Moshe Dayan, whilst Peretz renamed the party Rafi, before rejoining Likud on 27 May. Peretz then broke away from the other two to recreate the National List. However, the reconstituted party only lasted for 12 days as Peretz rejoined Likud.

In 1983 Hurvitz broke away from Telem to establish Rafi – National List, which he later renamed Ometz.

External links
National List Knesset website

Political parties disestablished in 1976
Political parties established in 1981
Political parties disestablished in 1981
Defunct political parties in Israel
Zionist political parties in Israel
Liberal parties in Israel